The cycling competition at the 2010 Commonwealth Games comprised two disciplines: road cycling and track cycling. The track events were held at the Indira Gandhi Arena, while the road events were held at Noida–Greater Noida Expressway. Track events were held from 5–9 October 2010.

Medal table

Medal summary

Road

Track

External links
Competition schedule

 
2010 Commonwealth Games events
Cycling at the Commonwealth Games
2010 in cycle racing
2010 in track cycling